Giorgio Rumignani (born 6 December 1939) is an Italian football striker and later manager.

References

1939 births
Living people
People from Gemona del Friuli
Italian footballers
A.S.D. Portogruaro players
A.S. Sambenedettese players
Cosenza Calcio players
A.C.N. Siena 1904 players
Pisa S.C. players
S.S. Arezzo players
Savona F.B.C. players
Association football forwards
Italian football managers
A.C.R. Messina managers
S.S.D. Varese Calcio managers
S.S.D. Lucchese 1905 managers
Palermo F.C. managers
Piacenza Calcio 1919 managers
A.S. Sambenedettese managers
S.S. Fidelis Andria 1928 managers
Pisa S.C. managers
Delfino Pescara 1936 managers
Ravenna F.C. managers
A.C. Monza managers
A.C. Reggiana 1919 managers
Benevento Calcio managers
S.S. Arezzo managers
Imolese Calcio 1919 managers
Calcio Foggia 1920 managers
Treviso F.B.C. 1993 managers
Serie B managers
Serie C managers
Footballers from Friuli Venezia Giulia